A call girl is a sex worker usually booked by telephone.

Call Girl(s) or The Call Girl(s) may also refer to:

Film 
The Call Girls (1973 film), a Hong Kong film
Call Girl (1974 film), a Bollywood musical
The Call Girls (1977 film), a Hong Kong drama
Call Girl '88, a 1988 Hong Kong drama
Call Girls (1997 film), a Japanese drama
Call Girl (2007 film), a Portuguese film
A Call Girl, a 2009 Slovenian drama
Call Girl (2012 film), a Swedish drama

Literature
The Call Girl, a 1958 nonfiction book by Harold Greenwald
The Call-Girls, a 1971 novel by Arthur Koestler

Music
Call Girl the Musical, a 2009 Australian musical
"Call Girl" (song), from the 2015 album FFS by FFS

Other uses 
"Call Girl" (Family Guy), a 2013 episode of the sitcom
Call Girl, an alias of fictional character Wendy Testaburger from South Park

See also

 Call (disambiguation)
 Escort (disambiguation)
 Girl (disambiguation)
 Hooker (disambiguation)
 Prostitute (disambiguation)
 Call centre
Call Center Girl, a 2013 Filipino film
 Phone sex
 Switchboard operator (phone operator)
 Telemarketer
 Television X Callgirls Live, a 2005 TV show